The Atlantic County Vocational School District  is a comprehensive vocational public school district serving the vocational and training needs of high school students in ninth through twelfth grades and adults from Atlantic County, New Jersey, United States. Both of the district's schools are located in the Mays Landing section of Hamilton Township.

As of the 2017-18 school year, the district and its two schools had an enrollment of 1,551 students and 133.6 classroom teachers (on an FTE basis), for a student–teacher ratio of 11.6:1.

Schools
Schools in the district (with 2017-18 enrollment data from the National Center for Education Statistics) are:
Atlantic County Institute of Technology (ACIT) is a four-year countywide vocational public high school  located on a  campus. The school was constructed in 1974 and underwent a major renovation in 1994. The school offers 30 different career programs. Shared-time students attend vocational programs at ACIT for part of the day, while receiving their academic instruction at one of the public high schools in the county. ACIT has articulation agreements with Atlantic Cape Community College, allowing students in certain programs to earn as many as 15 college credits for courses taken at ACIT. The school also has a similar partnership with Camden County College for students in the dental assistant program. (1,554 students in grades 9-12)
Atlantic County Alternative High School serves students from across the county who have not achieved in a traditional high school setting, offering an individualized program to help students develop academic and job preparation skills. (56 students in grades 9-12)

Administration
Core members of the district's administration are:
Dr. Philip J. Guenther, Superintendent
Lisa Mooney, Business Manager / Board Secretary

References

External links
Atlantic County Vocational School District

School Data for the Atlantic County Vocational School District, National Center for Education Statistics

Hamilton Township, Atlantic County, New Jersey
School districts in Atlantic County, New Jersey
Vocational school districts in New Jersey